Tolve is a town and comune in the province of Potenza, in the Southern Italian region of Basilicata.

History
Remains of pre-historic (Neolithic) settlements have been found in the nearby. In early historic times, the area was inhabited town of the Lucani, as testified by a tomb of a rich warrior from the 7th or 6th century BC, a temple of Cybele and countryside villas. It is also likely that the Tolve area was abandoned after Hannibal's arrival in southern Italy, as the first following traces of human presence date to the 1st century BC. Tolve is mentioned for the first time in the Lombard Edictum Rothari.

In the Middle Ages Tolve grew around a castle with three towers, first under the Byzantines and then under the Normans, as part of the county of Tricarico. In 1250 it was held by Galvano, an uncle of King Manfred of Sicily. After the Angevine conquest of the Kingdom of Sicily, it was a center for production of fire weapons starting from the 16th century.

International relations

Twin towns — Sister cities
Tolve is twinned with:
 Chieri, Italy
 Viggiano, Italy 
 Montpellier, France

Cities and towns in Basilicata